Events from the year 2005 in Burkina Faso.

Incumbents
President: Blaise Compaoré
Prime Minister: Paramanga Ernest Yonli

Events

May 
6 May – Burkinabe presidential election, 2005

July 
30 July – First microfinance agency is launched within the country

August 
14 August – 5 senior officials arrested for stealing foreign aid meant to combat hunger in rural areas

Deaths

References

 
Years of the 21st century in Burkina Faso
2000s in Burkina Faso
Burkina Faso
Burkina Faso